The Bengal monitor (Varanus bengalensis), also called the common Indian monitor, is a monitor lizard distributed widely in the Indian Subcontinent, as well as parts of Southeast Asia and West Asia. Young monitors may be more arboreal, but adults mainly hunt on the ground, preying mainly on arthropods, but also taking small terrestrial vertebrates, ground birds, eggs and fish. Although large Bengal monitors have few predators apart from humans who hunt them for meat, younger individuals are hunted by many predators.

Description 

The Bengal monitor can reach 175 cm with a snout-to-vent length (SVL) of 75 cm and a tail of 100 cm. Males are generally larger than females. Heavy individuals may weigh nearly 7.2 kg. The populations of monitors in India and Sri Lanka differ in the scalation from those of Myanmar; these populations were once considered subspecies of the Bengal monitor, but are now considered two species within the V. bengalensis species complex. What was once the nominate subspecies, V. bengalensis, is found west of Myanmar, while the clouded monitor (V. nebulosus) is found to the east. Clouded monitors can be differentiated by the presence of a series of enlarged scales in the supraocular region. The number of ventral scales varies, decreasing from 108 in the west to 75 in the east (Java).

Young monitor lizards are more colourful than adults. Young have a series of dark crossbars on the neck, throat and back. The belly is white, banded with dark crossbars and are spotted with grey or yellow (particularly in the eastern part of the range). On the dorsal surface of young monitors, there are a series of yellow spots with dark transverse bars connecting them. As they mature, the ground colour becomes light brown or grey, and dark spots give them a speckled appearance. Clouded monitor hatchlings by comparison tend to have a series of backward-pointing, V-shaped bands on their necks.

Bengal monitors have external nostril openings (nares) that is slit-like and oriented near horizontal, and positions between the eye and the tip of the snout. The nares can be closed at will, especially to keep away debris or water. The scales of the skin are rougher in patches and on the sides, they have minute pits, especially well distributed in males. These scales with micropores have glandular structures in the underlying dermal tissue and produce a secretion which may be a pheromone-like substance. Like other monitors, Bengal monitors have a forked tongue similar to snakes. The function is mainly sensory, and is not very involved in the transport of food down the throat. Bengal monitors have fat deposits in the tail and body that serve them in conditions when prey are not easily available.

The lungs have spongy tissue unlike the sacs of other saurians. This allows for a greater rate of gas exchange and allows a faster metabolic rate and higher activity levels. Like all monitors, they have subpleurodont teeth, meaning the teeth are fused to the inside of the jaw bones. The teeth are placed one behind another, and there are replacement teeth behind and between each functional tooth (polyphyodont). The maxillary and dentary teeth are laterally compressed, sometimes with a slightly serrate cutting edge, while the premaxillary teeth are conical. There are 78 premaxillary teeth, 10 maxillary and 13 dentary teeth. Replacement teeth move forward and about four replacements happens each year for a tooth. While monitor lizards are venomous, there are no reports of the effects of venom in Bengal monitors other than a very controversial case report of fatal renal failure as a result of envenomation from this species.

Distribution and habitat 

The species ranges from Iran to Java, among the most widely distributed of monitor lizards as they are eurytopic and adaptable to a range of habitats. It is found in river valleys in eastern Iran, Afghanistan, India, Nepal, Sri Lanka, Pakistan, Bangladesh and Burma. The closely related species, the clouded monitor, occurs in southern Myanmar, Vietnam, Cambodia, Thailand, Malaysia, Sumatra, Java and the Sunda Islands. They have not been confirmed on Sumatra, and have been found to be absent from the Andaman Islands.

The species is mainly distributed through lower elevations below an altitude of 1500 metres, and is found both in dry semiarid desert habitats to moist forest. They are often found in agricultural areas.

Ecology and behaviour 

Bengal monitors are usually solitary and usually found on the ground, although the young are often seen on trees. Clouded monitors by contrast have a greater propensity for tree climbing. Bengal and yellow monitors are sympatric but are partially separated by their habitat as Bengal monitors prefers forest over agricultural areas. Bengal monitors shelter in burrows they dig or crevices in rocks and buildings, whilst clouded monitors prefer tree hollows. Both species will make use of abandoned termite mounds. Bengal monitors are diurnal like other monitors, becoming active around 6 AM and bask in the morning sun. During winter in the colder parts of their range, they may take shelter and go through a period of reduced metabolic activity. They are not territorial, and may change their range seasonally in response to food availability.

They are usually shy and avoid humans. They have keen eyesight and can detect human movement nearly 250 m away. When caught, a few individuals may bite, but rarely do so.

Although they are found on agricultural land, they prefer forests with large trees. Generally, high ground cover with large trees are favorable areas.

Captives have been known to live for nearly 22 years. Predators of adults include pythons, mammalian predators and birds. A number of ectoparasites and endoparasites are recorded.

Breeding 
Females may be able to retain sperm, and females held in confinement have been able to lay fertile eggs. Some species of monitor lizards such as the Nile monitor have additionally demonstrated to be capable of parthenogenesis. The main breeding season is June to September, but males begin to show combat behaviour by April. Females dig a nest hole in level ground or a vertical bank and lay the eggs inside, filling it up and using their snouts to compact the soil. The females often dig false nests nearby and shovel soil around the area. They sometimes make use of a termite mound to nest. A single clutch of about 20 eggs are laid. The eggs hatch in 168 to nearly as long as 254 days. About 40-80% of the eggs may hatch.

Locomotion 
They are capable of rapid movement on the ground. Small individuals may climb trees to escape, but larger ones prefer to escape on the ground. They can climb well. On the ground, they sometimes stand on the hind legs to get a better view or when males fight other males. They can also swim well and can stay submerged for at least 17 minutes. They can use both trees and bushes for shelter.

Feeding 
Bengal monitors tend to remain active the whole day. Large adults may ascend vertical tree trunks, where they sometimes stalk and capture roosting bats. The species is a generalist, and feeds on a varied diet of invertebrates and vertebrates. Invertebrate prey mostly consists of beetles and their larvae followed by orthopterans, but also maggots, caterpillars, centipedes, scorpions, crabs, crayfish, snails, termites, ants, and earwigs. Larger individuals in addition to invertebrates also eat a large amount of vertebrate prey, including toads and frogs and their eggs, fish, lizards, snakes, rats, squirrels, hares, musk shrews, and birds. Hares and rodents such as Indian bandicoot rats are often caught by digging them out of their nests. Diet may differ based on season and locality, for example, they often forage for fish and aquatic insects in streams during the summer, and individuals in Andhra Pradesh eat mostly frogs and toads. Bengal monitors will also scavenge carrion, and sometimes congregate when feeding on large carcasses such as that of deer. In areas where livestock are common, they often seek out dung to forage for beetles and other insects.

In culture 

Folk mythology across the region includes the idea that these lizards, though actually harmless, are venomous, and in Rajasthan, the locals believe that the lizards become venomous only during the rainy season. Monitor lizards are hunted, and their body fat, extracted by boiling, is used in a wide range of folk remedies.

In Sri Lanka, the water monitor (Kabaragoya) is considered venomous and dangerous when confronted, while the Bengal monitor (Thalagoya) is considered harmless and rather defenseless. Land monitor meat is considered edible (especially by indigenous Veddah and Rodiya people) while water monitor meat is not. Killing a land monitor is usually considered a cowardly act, and is frequently referred to folklore along with other harmless reptiles such as rat snakes (Garandiya).

A clan in Maharashtra called Ghorpade claims that the name is derived from a legendary founder Tanaji Malusare who supposedly scaled a fort wall using a monitor lizard tied to a rope. 

The Bengal monitor's belly skin has traditionally been used in making the drum head for the kanjira (known as Dimadi in Maharashtra), a South Indian percussion instrument.

Conservation 

While it is assessed LC (Least Concern) by the IUCN 2009, the assessment currently requires updating. The Bengal monitor is listed as Appendix I of CITES and Schedule I of the 1972 Wildlife Protection Act. The wild population is decreasing as it is hunted for both consumption and medicinal purposes as well as for the skin. As it is adaptable to a range of habitats, the threat of habitat degradation is relatively less prominent and is superseded by the threat of agricultural pollution, as pesticides reduce the availability of prey. In Iran, it is also sometimes killed due to being seen as a dangerous threat.

Notes

References
 
 
 Auffenberg, W. 1979 Research on monitor lizards. Tiger Paper 6(4): 20–21.
 Auffenberg, W. 1981 Combat behaviour in Varanus bengalensis. J.Bombay N.H.S. 78(1):54-72.
 Auffenberg, W. 1983 The burrows of Varanus bengalensis. Rec. Zool. Surv. India 80:375-385.
 Auffenberg, W. 1983 Courtship behaviour in Varanus bengalensis. In Advances in Herpetology and Evolutionary Biology: Essays in Honor of Ernest E. Williams (Rhodin & Myata eds.): 535–551.
 Auffenberg, W. 1983 Notes on feeding behaviour of Varanus bengalensis. J. Bombay N.H.S. 80 (2): 286–302.
 Auffenberg, W. 1986. The Indian monitor lizard. Sanctuary Asia. 6 (4):327-333.
 Ghimire, H. R. & Shah, K. B. (2014). Status and habitat ecology of the Yellow Monitor, Varanus flavescens, in the Southeastern part of Kanchanpur District, Nepal. Herpetological Conservation and Biology, 9(2), 387–393. http://www.herpconbio.org/Volume_9/Issue_2/Ghimire_Shah_2014.pdf
 Mertens, R. 1942. Ein weiterer neuer Warane aus Australien. Zool. Anz. 137: 41-44

External links 

 The online Little Book of Monitor Lizards

Varanus
Lizards of Asia
Reptiles of India
Reptiles of Nepal
Reptiles of Sri Lanka
Reptiles of Bangladesh
Reptiles of Myanmar
Reptiles of Laos
Reptiles of Vietnam
Reptiles of Cambodia
Reptiles of Thailand
Reptiles of Malaysia
Reptiles of Brunei
Reptiles of Indonesia
Reptiles of Iran
Reptiles described in 1802
Taxa named by François Marie Daudin
Reptiles of Borneo